Thamaramkulangara Sree Dharma Sastha temple (Malayalam: താമരംകുളങ്ങര ശ്രി ധര്‍മശാസ്താ ക്ഷേത്രം) is a temple in Tripunithura, Kochi, in the state of Kerala, India.

References

External links
 Official Site of the Temple
 Location - WikiMapia
 Orkut Community
 Zonkerala Listing

Hindu temples in Ernakulam district